You Get Me is a 2017 American thriller film directed by Brent Bonacorso, written by Ben Epstein, and starring Bella Thorne, Halston Sage, Taylor John Smith, Anna Akana and  Nash Grier. It was released on Netflix on June 23, 2017.

Plot 
Tyler is a high school student in love with his girlfriend Alison ("Ali"). One night at a party, Tyler discovers that Ali used to be a heavy partier and would often drink and sleep around. Tyler gets angry and the couple break up. Outside the party, he meets the mysterious Holly. They end up partying and sleeping together. They spend the rest of the weekend bonding and making love in Holly's huge house, with Holly telling Tyler her father died and her stepmother travels a lot. Tyler says that the weekend was special before leaving, seemingly forgetting all about Ali.

Tyler gets back together with Ali the following day and, while at school, notices Holly. Holly reveals that she goes there now and wanted to surprise him. Tyler tries cutting ties with Holly multiple times but he fails each time. Holly starts hanging out with Ali, as well as Ali and Tyler's friends, Gil and Lydia. Lydia soon becomes suspicious of Holly when she discovers Holly's lack of any  social media presence. Some time passes and Tyler begins to suspect that Holly is dangerous, especially when meeting her stepmother, Corinne, who reveals that Holly takes medication for a mental disorder. The next day, Holly intentionally causes Lydia to have an extreme allergic reaction after overhearing her telling Ali that she doesn't buy Holly's story and is going to find out what's going on.

Holly later shows up at Tyler's house, telling him that she wants the two of them to get back together. When Tyler rebukes her,  Holly tells Ali that she and Tyler slept together. Tyler and Ali meet at the beach, where he confesses everything to her. Ali states that she never wants to talk to him again, before leaving. Holly then proceeds to get Tyler suspended, saying that he assaulted her. While on suspension, Tyler finds out that Holly's real first name is Elizabeth, and then looks her up online and discovers that she violently assaulted another female student over a boy and was committed to a mental institution for a while as a result. That night, Holly kidnaps Ali and then lures Tyler to her house by sending him a picture of an unconscious Ali. Meanwhile, Ali awakens to discover that she has been tied up and bound to a chair in Holly's house. Corinne comes home and finds Ali and attempts to rescue her. However, Holly sneaks up behind Corinne and suffocates her with a plastic bag, killing her.

When Tyler arrives at Holly's house, armed with a fire poker, he discovers Ali unconscious. Ali has been tied mid-air to the ceiling, with her 
forehead bleeding. Tyler manages to free Ali, and the two escape outside. Before they can get away, Holly stops them at gunpoint. Holly shoots Tyler in the shoulder, and Ali picks up the fire poker and stabs Holly. Later, Holly, still alive, is wheeled into the back of an ambulance and asks the paramedic to never leave her and makes him promise.

In the final scene, Tyler and Allison are at his younger sister, Tiffany's, birthday party. Tyler narrates and says he was looking for a fantasy about love. But he's learned his lesson, and now is focused on the love he has with Allison.

Cast 
 Bella Thorne as Holly Viola
 Halston Sage as Alison Hewitt
 Taylor John Smith as Tyler Hanson
 Nash Grier as Gil
 Anna Akana as Lydia
 Rhys Wakefield as Chase
 Brigid Brannagh as Corinne
 Kathryn Morris as Mrs. Hewitt
 Kimberly Williams-Paisley as Mrs. Hanson
 Yasmin Al-Bustami as Melinda
 Farrah Mackenzie as Tiffany
 Joshua Banday as Mr. Ahmed
 Garcelle Beauvais as Principal

Production

Casting 
Bella Thorne and Halston Sage were cast as female leads Holly and Ali, respectively in March 2016. Taylor John Smith was cast as male lead Tyler in April 2016. Added to the cast at the same time were Nash Grier, Anna Akana, Garcelle Beauvais and Kathryn Morris.

Filming 
Filming on You Get Me began in Los Angeles in April 2016 and wrapped in May 2016. Filming also took place on the beach in Santa Monica.

Release
The film had its world premiere at the Los Angeles Film Festival June 14–22, 2017. It was originally scheduled to be released on Netflix on June 16, but it was released on June 23, 2017.

Reception

Brian Costello of Common Sense Media calls the film "a mess from beginning to end".
Eddie Strait of The Daily Dot says "this film is no fun", and further criticizes the film not only for lacking in originality but also dullness. Felix Vasquez Jr. of Cinema Crazed describes it as "an abysmal entry in to this ridiculous sub-genre" and that although the film aspires to be Fatal Attraction, "it barely registers as a Swimfan clone".

References

External links
 You Get Me on Netflix
 
 

2017 films
2017 thriller drama films
2010s high school films
2010s teen drama films
American high school films
American teen drama films
American thriller drama films
Awesomeness Films films
Films about stalking
Films shot in Los Angeles
English-language Netflix original films
Teen thriller films
2010s English-language films
2017 directorial debut films
2010s American films